Gordon John Walsh (b Dublin 1880 - d Ely 1971) was an Anglican bishop of the Diocese of Hokkaido, in the Nippon Sei Ko Kai, the province of the Anglican Communion in Japan.

Walsh was educated at Sutton Valence School and Trinity College, Dublin. He was ordained in 1903. He was a curate in Belfast from 1903 to 1909. He was Rector of St Peter, Athlone (now owned by the Catholic Church and known as Corpus Christi Priory) from 1910 to 1913, when he became a CMS missionary. He served at Tokushima, Hakodate and Asahigawa, eventually becoming Bishop of Hokkaido in 1927, serving until 1940. Returning to England, Walsh was Vicar of Eastry and Tilmanstone, Kent from 1941 to 1942, and a Residentiary Canon of Ely Cathedral from 1942 to 1967 and Assistant Bishop of Ely, 1942 til death.

References

External links
bromide print of Walsh c.1920s
photograph of Walsh, 1947

British expatriates in Japan
Irish bishops
1880 births
1971 deaths
People educated at Sutton Valence School
Alumni of Trinity College Dublin
Anglican bishops of Hokkaido